The Insights Association, formed by the merger of the Council of American Survey Research Organizations (CASRO) and the Marketing Research Association (MRA) in January 2017, with more than 325 member companies and their 32,000 employees, all of whom are afforded membership benefits, represent nearly $8 billion in global annual revenue—about 85% of the U.S. research industry and 30% of the global research industry. IA's members annually reaffirm their adherence to the IA Code of Standards and Ethics for Marketing Research and Data Analytics, a code of business and professional standards.

See also
 American Association for Public Opinion Research
 European Society for Opinion and Marketing Research

References 

Professional associations based in the United States
Trade associations based in the United States